Bellegarde may refer to:

People
 Bellegarde (surname)

Places

Canada

 Bellegarde, Saskatchewan, a French-Canadian settlement in Saskatchewan

Communes in France

 Bellegarde, Gard
 Bellegarde, Gers
 Bellegarde, Loiret
 Bellegarde, Tarn
 Bellegarde-du-Razès, in the Aude département
 Bellegarde-en-Diois, in the Drôme département
 Bellegarde-en-Forez, in the Loire département
 Bellegarde-en-Marche, in the Creuse département
 Bellegarde-Poussieu, in the Isère département
 Bellegarde-Sainte-Marie, in the Haute-Garonne département
 Bellegarde-sur-Valserine, in the Ain département
 Bellegarde station

See also 
 Château de Bellegarde (disambiguation)
 Fort de Bellegarde, in the Pyrénées-Orientales département in France